When I Was Young in the Mountains is a 1982 children's book by Cynthia Rylant, who has written over 60 children's books such as Missing May, which won the Newbery Medal.  The book, which Rylant later said took her but an hour to complete, earned an American Book Award in 1982 and Diane Goode's illustrations won it a Caldecott Honor for children's literature.

Plot Summary
The book tells the story of the main character's youth in West Virginia, in the Appalachian Mountains. The book is based on Rylant's real life growing up in West Virginia.

About the Author 
A West Virginia native, Cynthia Rylant spent her childhood surrounded by relatives and the Appalachian Mountains. Though she was born in Hopewell, West Virginia (June 6th, 1954), Rylant primarily resided with her grandparents in Cool Ridge, West Virginia, after facing her parents' divorce. Drawing inspiration from her father's love of storytelling, Rylant fostered the gift she shared with her father into a career.

Awards and Critical Praise 

 When I Was Young In the Mountains was named among the best children and young adult books of 1982 by Horn Book Fanfare.
 American Book Award in 1982.
 Diane Goode's illustrations won the book a Caldecott Honor for children's literature.

References

1982 children's books
American picture books
Caldecott Honor-winning works
Literary autobiographies
Appalachia in fiction
West Virginia in fiction